North Dakota Highway 66 (ND 66) is a  east–west state highway in the U.S. state of North Dakota. ND 66's western terminus is at ND 3 south of Dunseith, and the eastern terminus is a continuation as Minnesota State Highway 11 (MN 11) at the Minnesota/ North Dakota border.

Major intersections

References

066
Transportation in Rolette County, North Dakota
Transportation in Towner County, North Dakota
Transportation in Cavalier County, North Dakota
Transportation in Pembina County, North Dakota